Palaeosoma is an extinct genus of archipolypodan millipedes from the upper Carboniferous of England and Poland. Species of Palaeosoma were once considered members of the family Euphoberiidae, which contains species with prominent spines, but are now classified in their own family (Paleosomatidae) and own order (Palaeosomatida), as they lack spines and have a combination of features not seen in other Paleozoic millipedes.

References

†Palaeosoma
Prehistoric myriapod genera
Carboniferous myriapods
Fossil taxa described in 1919
Fossils of Poland
Fossils of Great Britain